12 is an American independent feature film written, directed, edited and produced over the course of 10 years by filmmaker Lawrence Bridges. Considered the longest continuous production in film's history, up to that point, 12 is also the first film to use the aging of its actors as a practical effect. The film received acclaim from such notable publications as Variety, Shoot, and the Los Angeles Times, while playing at over 15 festivals worldwide.

Synopsis

The film is a postmodern spoof that tells the story of Zeus' modern-day illegitimate children, Filmore (Tony Griffin) and his half-sister Marie-Noel (Alison Elliott), who are forced to move from their ranch on the Channel Islands because their neighbors have grown suspicious of the fact they haven't aged for decades. Meanwhile, the U.S. government wants to turn their land into a national park. When the twelve Greek Gods return to Los Angeles for relaxation Zeus expects them to correctly identify the play fated and modeled around their current lives, Oscar Wilde's The Importance of Being Earnest, and perform the work flawlessly, in its entirety, for the Gods' entertainment. By such means, as the play's plot unfolds, the children are guaranteed new, credible lives. "Act or die," he commands. But if they fail to perform the play to its conclusion, or if they rebel, they will be killed by jealous Hera. The mere existence of these illegitimate children are an outrage to her, representing Zeus' countless infidelities.

12, whose title is often mistakenly derived from the number of years it took to create the film, is described by Variety as "equal parts L.A. love story, The Importance of Being Earnest, spoof on Greek gods and personal diary of actual events from 1988 to 1998."

Cast

Production
Shot over the course of a decade, Bridges filmed 12 whenever the actors were available and "never imposed a deadline" on the project.  Throughout the course of shooting, Bridges captured footage of natural disasters and major political events, including the 1994 Northridge earthquake, the Malibu fires, four lunar eclipses and two eclipses of the sun and the Rodney King riots, which were all included in the film. Bridges explained, "My camera was always loaded and the batteries charged and often it traveled with me in my car to and from work. When there was a disaster, I was always ready to document it."

In a rare twist of fate, nearly all of the original actors cast participated in the entire shoot, despite some road blocks along the way. While on a separate commercial shoot in Minneapolis, Allen Lulu suffered a heart attack caused by Phen-Phen. Additionally, Golde Starger' was diagnosed with cancer in the middle of the shoot, and thankfully, recovered. "There were divorces and there were babies born. I guess when you look at all the things that could have gone wrong and didn't, I'm a very lucky man," Bridges told Indie Slate. Additionally, Bridges adopted a flexible mentality in regards to continuity. As the actors aged and evolved, the one factor that remained semi-constant was wardrobe. For example, Griffin, who played Filmore, wore the same suite for 10 years. Dramatic hair and weight change was even accounted for in the storyline. 
  
The film was shot on 35mm Kodak short ends using Arri cameras and Zeiss Superspeed prime lenses. The short ends were stock test samples from 1989 to 1999. The production used minimal on-set lighting, mostly opting for available light. The camera dolly used throughout the production of the film was actually a homemade dolly that Bridges converted from a baby stroller.

Style 
More than its plot and themes, 12 is recognized for its unique style. Drawing inspiration from the French New Wave movement, poetry, and improvisation techniques, Bridges' film is inconsistent in tone, which some believe occurred because of the large span of time in which it was produced. One journalist described 12 as "shifting capriciously between the near-profound and the pointlessly silly." The first half of the film especially has been considered nonlinear in regards to its narrative structure.

Music 
None of the music in 12 was original score, yet the film incorporated over 100 different cues of music. More than 60 of those cues were classical in nature, incorporating Mozart, Beethoven, Bach and the like. 12 is the first film for which the composer John Adams has allowed his music to be used.

Themes
12 explores a variety of themes and attitudes that relate to a postmodern perspective on Greek mythology set within modern day Los Angeles. The idea of juxtaposition—Oscar Wilde / Greek mythology, mortals/immortals, grand scenery/run down Los Angeles streets is evidenced throughout. As Bridges himself states, "12 is a diary of L.A., a cinematic record of the natural and political convulsions gripping our town during the late-1980s and into the millennium."

Bridges explained his rationale in making 12 to Shoot saying,"Being the filmmaker, I clearly am defining myself as a radical independent. That's why I made the film. It's anti-everything in Hollywood. Not because of Hollywood – this is what I would do under any circumstance. I'm in love with the aesthetic, poetic and literary potential of film, and that's what I wanted to express."

Distribution and publicity

Just as the film blurs the boundaries of life and art, so does its distribution. 12 is shown via guerrilla drive-ins, a movement the filmmaker created, which entails projecting the piece on walls of buildings throughout Los Angeles and instructing viewers to tune their car radios to a specified station. Locations have included a Staples store on Sunset Boulevard, a parking lot behind the Los Angeles Police Department's Hollywood offices and a parking lot near a Sportmart in West Los Angeles.

Bridges said he created the guerrilla drive-in in an effort to "paint the artwork back on the subject of its inception – projecting what you filmed back on to the wall at night." Although the film was an out of pocket expense for Bridges, he has said he is "waiting for the audience to find it, in terms of the marketplace," but also considers 12 to be public art that was privately funded.

In 2002, Bridges began a grassroots effort to be considered for Academy awards and passed out 12 T-shirts to members of the Academy. However, police mistook him as a street vagrant and had him taken into custody. Coincidentally, the Los Angeles Times caught the incident on camera and published an image of Bridges being arrested wearing the '12 for Best Picture' shirt.

Critical reception

Although it never saw commercial success, 12 is considered a cult film that has played at more than 15 festivals worldwide and was honored with a "Best of Fest" award at the Syracuse International Film and Video Festival in 2004. It is critically acclaimed for its unique production process, complex and current themes and stunning visuals.

LA Weekly film critic Paul Malcolm praised the filmmaker's inventive nature, writing, "Bridges, a director of television commercials, has a feel for transformative compositions that can remake even the most familiar environment -- a kitchen pantry, a corner on Wilshire Boulevard -- into a place of wonder."

Variety reviewer Robert Koehler applauded Bridges for his "dizzying, unforgettable adventure," writing, "Griffin and Elliott provide a good grounding for the viewer's attention as the deconstructed stream of images and story roll by, but much of the fascination here is not in the highly uneven perfs, but in pic's raw enthusiasm for the film medium, montage, the juxtaposition of image and sound and the reimagining of Greek classicism in a SoCal setting."

Tod Booth of the San Francisco Film Society called 12 "ambitious, discursive and hilarious" and described the film to be "as challenging and sweeping as a Pynchon novel-a Marx Brothers version of a Wagnerian opera, with Jean-Luc Godard mixed in."

In his monthly Media Matters column on Hollywood Network, Miles Beller wrote, "12 is by turns funny and infuriating, loony and inspire. Here is a movie that juggles actualities and artifice with manic glee. [...] [Bridges'] 12 is a daring, new vision of the human condition, a work of art that sublimely shows the folly and fulfillment of the ascent of man."

References

External links
 
 

2003 films
2003 comedy films
2003 independent films
American comedy films
American independent films
Films based on classical mythology
Films directed by Lawrence Bridges
Films set in Los Angeles
2000s American films